2011 Yokohama FC season.

J2 League

References

External links
 J.League official site

Yokohama FC
Yokohama FC seasons